Midway Historic District may refer to:

in the United States
(by state then city)
 Midway Subdivision Historic District, listed on the National Register of Historic Places (NRHP) in Manatee County
 Midway Historic District (Midway, Georgia), listed on the NRHP in Liberty County
 Midway Historic District (Midway, Kentucky), listed on the NRHP in Woodford County